(27 March 2000 – 2 September 2022) was a Japanese Thoroughbred racehorse and active sire. In a racing career which lasted from February 2003 until December 2005, he ran twenty times, winning seven races and being placed on ten further occasions. As a three-year-old in 2003, he won two Group races and finished second in the Tokyo Yushun (Japanese Derby). His greatest success came as a four-year-old in the following year when he was named Japanese Horse of the Year after winning the three all-aged Group One races which comprise Japan's Autumn Triple Crown: the Autumn Tenno Sho, the Japan Cup, and the Arima Kinen. In 2005, he failed to win but was placed in the International Stakes in Britain as well as in the Tenno Sho and Japan Cup. He was then retired to stud where he had success as a sire of winners.

Background
Zenno Rob Roy was a bay horse with one white foot, standing just under 16.2 hands high. He was bred in Japan by the Shiraoi Farm, from parents both of whom had been imported from the United States. He was sired by Sunday Silence, who won the 1989 Kentucky Derby, before retiring to stud in Japan where he was champion sire on thirteen consecutive occasions. His dam Roamin' Rachel was a successful racemare who excelled over sprint distances, winning the Grade I Ballerina Handicap in 1994 before being sold for $750,000 and exported to Japan in 1998.

Racing career

2003: three-year-old season
Zenno Rob Roy made his first appearance in a one-mile maiden race at Nakayama Racecourse in February, and won by two and a half lengths. He then finished third to Lincoln at Hanshin Racecourse before winning again at Nakayama in April. On 3 May at Tokyo Racecourse, Zenno Rob Roy recorded his first important victory when he won the one and a half mile Aoba Sho, an important trial race for the Tokyo Yushun. Over the same course and distance a month later, the colt finished second in the Tokyo Yushun, half a length behind the winner Neo Universe.

Zenno Rob Roy returned in September to win the Kobe Shimbun Hai, a trial race for the Kikuka Sho (Japanese St Leger). In the Kikuka Sho a month later he finished fourth of the eighteen runners behind That's The Plenty, Lincoln and Neo Universe after being boxed in and struggling to obtain a clear run on the turn into the straight. On his final appearance of the season, the colt was one of the twelve horses invited to contest the Arima Kinen at Nakayama on 28 December and finished third behind Symboli Kris S and Lincoln.

2004: four-year-old season
In March 2004, Zenno Rob Roy came second to Win Generale in the Group Two Nikkei Sho and then finished second to Ingrandire in the spring running of the Tenno Sho over two miles.  On 27 June he finished fourth of the fifteen runners in the Takarazuka Kinen, three lengths behind the winner Tap Dance City.

Zenno Rob Roy began his autumn campaign in the Group Two Kyoto Daishoten on 10 October, when he started the 2/5 favourite but was beaten by Narita Century. Despite his defeat the colt started favourite for the autumn running of the Tenno Sho three weeks later. Ridden for the first time by Olivier Peslier he was held up in the early stages and turned into the straight in ninth place. He made steady progress in the last quarter mile to take the lead close to the finish and won by one and a quarter lengths from the three-year-old filly Dance in the Mood. Four weeks later, Zenno Rob Roy started the 1.7/1 favourite for the Japan Cup, then the world's most valuable turf race, at Tokyo racecourse, in front of a crowd of 119,362. Peslier moved the colt up to challenge for the lead in the straight and he drew clear in the closing stages to win by three lengths from Cosmo Bulk and Delta Blues. On 26 December Zenno Rob Roy attempted to complete Japan's Autumn Triple Crown when he was one of fifteen horses invited to contest the Arima Kinen. Under a strong ride from Peslier, he overtook the front-running Tap Dance City inside the final furlong and won by half a length. The winning time of 2:29.5 was a record for the 2,500 metre race and the four-year-old's victory was enthusiastically received by the 125,000 crowd.

His performances saw him voted Champion Older Horse and Japanese Horse of the Year in January 2005.

2005: five-year-old season
Zenno Rob Roy did not begin his five-year-old season until 26 June, when he finished third behind Sweep Tosho and Heart's Cry in the Takarazuka Kinen. He was then sent to Europe where he was lodged at the stables of Geoff Wragg at Newmarket and in August he contested the International Stakes at York Racecourse. He stayed on well in the closing stages to finish second of the seven runners, a neck behind the winner Electrocutionist in a "blanket finish".

The colt returned to Japan where he ran in all three legs of the Autumn Triple Crown. He was beaten a head by Heavenly Romance in the Tenno Sho and then ran third behind Alkaased and Heart's Cry in the Japan Cup. On his final appearance he finished unplaced behind Heart's Cry in the Arima Kinen.

Stud record
Zenno Rob Roy was retired from racing to stand as a stallion at the Shadai Stallion Station in Hokkaido and was shuttled to stand in New Zealand during the southern hemisphere breeding season. In 2007 he covered mares in Australia after being stranded there by travel restrictions following an outbreak of horse flu. His most successful runner as of his death was the Yushun Himba (Japanese Oaks) winner Saint Emilion. He also sired the Group race winners Pelusa, Animate Bio, Lelouch, Trailblazer, Cosmo Nemo Shin and Zennista.

Zenno Rob Roy died from heart failure on 2 September 2022.

Pedigree

References

2000 racehorse births
2022 racehorse deaths
Racehorses bred in Japan
Racehorses trained in Japan
Thoroughbred family 2-b
Japan Cup winners